Neotettix proavus, known generally as the fork-face pygmy grasshopper or fork-face grouse locust, is a species of pygmy grasshopper in the family Tetrigidae. It is found in North America.

References

Tetrigidae
Articles created by Qbugbot
Insects described in 1916